The Canisius Golden Griffins men's ice hockey team is a National Collegiate Athletic Association (NCAA) Division I college ice hockey program that represents Canisius College. The Golden Griffins are a member of Atlantic Hockey. They play at the LECOM Harborcenter in Buffalo, New York across the street from KeyBank Center, home of the Buffalo Sabres of the National Hockey League. Canisius won an automatic bid to the 2013 NCAA Men's Ice Hockey Championship after winning the Atlantic Hockey title in the conference playoffs, but lost in the first round to top-ranked Quinnipiac.

History

Early years
Canisius founded their hockey team, then known as the Ice Griffs, in the fall of 1971 as a club sport led by Dr. David Dietz. Two years later they joined their first conference and by 1976 had claimed two conference titles. Dietz resigned after the 1976 championship and allowed Mike Kelly to take over. Kelly kept the team performing at a high level but finished runner up two years running before reclaiming the title in 1979. Canisius join a new conference the following year and after claiming the championship, their fourth in a six-year span, the program was elevated to varsity status.

With a new division to play in Canisius also received a new coach in Brian Cavanaugh. Their first two seasons in Division III went well for the Golden Griffins but when Cavanaugh took a year off in 1982 the program slumped to single-digit wins before rebounding after the coach's return. During Cavanaugh's tenure he kept the team mostly above .500 and aside from a dip in the early 1990s Canisius was a contender for the ECAC West crown most years. Canisius was able to reach two ECAC West title game in the '90s but lost both contests by one goal.

Division I
When the MAAC announced it was forming an ice hockey division in 1997 only three member teams had extant programs, one of those was Canisius who became a founding member of the league that began play in 1998–99. The Golden Griffins played well in their first season, finishing with a winning record, but it was their play in the conference tournament, allowing them to reach the title match, that made Canisius stand out. Unfortunately that was the height of Canisius' time in the MAAC. Despite a 20-win season the following year the Griffs were bounced in the first round and won only one MAAC playoff game after their inaugural year in D-I.

When two of the MAAC's teams ended their ice hockey sponsorship in 2003 the conference was able to end its support for the hockey division. The remaining nine schools simply reformed into a new conference called Atlantic Hockey and continued on without much trouble. Canisius' trouble in the conference tournament continued throughout the decade and saw them win two out of their first ten games. During that streak, however, the Canisius program went through some upheaval. Long-time coach Brian Cavanaugh came under fire for his conduct through complaints from his players. In December 2004 he was fired when players threatened to sit out a game and he was soon replaced by assistant Clancy Seymour. The following season began with yet a third coach, Dave Smith and it took the new bench boss a few years to repair the program.

In 2009–10 Canisius posted its first winning season in nine years and reach the conference semifinal. After a couple of modest seasons the Golden Griffins shocked Atlantic Hockey by winning the 2013 Tournament as a 7th-seed and made its first appearance in the NCAA Tournament. The Golden Griffins played well but bowed out in their first game against top-seeded Quinnipiac. Over the next few years Smith pushed the program to better results, culminating in their first conference title in 2017. Smith was hired away by Rensselaer soon after but the Golden Griffins continue to perform well under new coach Trevor Large.

Season-by-season results

Source:

All-time coaching records
As of the completion of 2021–22 season

† interim head coach
‡ fired mid-season

Awards and honors
Source:

NCAA
AHCA First Team All-Americans
2016-17: Charles Williams, G

MAAC

Individual Awards
MAAC Goaltender of the Year
Sean Weaver: 2000

All-Conference Teams
First Team All-MAAC

1998–99: Derek Gilham, D
1999–00: Sean Weaver, G

Second Team All-MAAC
1998–99: David Deeves, F

MAAC All-Rookie Team

1998–99:Joel Tarvudd, D; David Deeves, F
2002–03: Tim Songin, D

Atlantic Hockey

Individual Awards

Player of the Year
Cory Conacher: 2010
Charles Williams: 2017
Dylan McLaughlin: 2018

Rookie of the Year
David Kostuch: 2009

Coach of the Year
Dave Smith: 2017

Best Defensive Forward
David Kasch: 2008
Ryan Schmelzer: 2017

Best Defenseman
Cameron Heath: 2017

Regular Season Scoring Trophy
Cory Conacher, LW: 2010
Dylan McLaughlin: 2018

Regular Season Goaltending Award
Keegan Asmundson: 2015
Charles Williams: 2017
Jacob Barczewski: 2021

Individual Sportsmanship Award
Dylan McLaughlin: 2019

Most Valuable Player in Tournament
Kyle Gibbons, F: 2013
Jacob Barczewski, G: 2023

All-Conference Teams
First Team All-Atlantic Hockey

2004–05: Bryan Worosz, G
2009–10: Cory Conacher, F
2014–15: Chris Rumble, D
2015–16: Shane Conacher, F
2016–17: Charles Williams, F
2017–18: Cameron Heath, F; Dylan McLaughlin, F
2018–19: Dylan McLaughlin, F
2020–21: Jacob Barczewski, G; Keaton Mastrodonato, F
2021–22: Jacob Barczewski, G

Second Team All-Atlantic Hockey

2009–10: Carl Hudson, D
2010–11: Cory Conacher, F
2014–15: Keegan Asmundson, G; Ralph Cuddemi, F
2015–16: Ralph Cuddemi, F
2016–17: Cameron Heath, D; Ryan Schmelzer, F
2017–18: Lester Lancaster, D
2019–20: Matt Hoover, F; Nick Hutchison, F
2021–22: Keaton Mastrodonato, F

Third Team All-Atlantic Hockey

2008–09: Carl Hudson, D; Jason Weeks, F
2009–10: Vincent Scarcella, F
2012–13: Kyle Gibbons, F
2015–16: Ben Danforth, D
2016–17: Dylan McLaughlin, F
2017–18: Ryan Schmelzer, F
2019–20: Matt Stief, F
2021–22: David Melaragni, F
2022–23: Jacob Barczewski, G; Keaton Mastrodonato, F

Atlantic Hockey All-Rookie Team

2005–06: Dan Giffin, G
2006–07: Josh Heidinger, F
2007–08: Vincent Scarsella, F
2008–09: David Kostuch, F
2016–17: Nick Hutchinson, F
2017–18: Grant Meyer, F

Canisius Hall of Fame
The following is a list of Canisius' men's ice hockey players who were elected into the Canisius College Hall of Fame (induction year in parenthesis).

Derrick Bishop (2013)
Andre Bourgeault (2006)
Dr. David Dietz (2001)
Joe Federico (2005)
Josh Oort (2010)
Gary Roessler (1998)
Mike Sisti (2002)
Kevin Sykes (1999)
Mike Torrillo (1999)
Brian Worosz (2016)

Statistical leaders
Source:

Career points leaders

Career goaltending leaders

GP = Games played; Min = Minutes played; GA = Goals against; SO = Shutouts; SV% = Save percentage; GAA = Goals against average

Minimum 2000 minutes

Statistics current through the start of the 2021-22 season.

Current roster
As of August 1, 2022.

Notable former players
Notable alumni include:
Dylan McLaughlin '19: Signed to an NHL contract by the St. Louis Blues
Carl Hudson '10: Signed to an NHL contract by the Florida Panthers
Ryan Stewart '98: Current Senior Advisor for the San Jose Sharks and 3x Stanley Cup champion as Director of Pro Scouting with the Chicago Blackhawks

Golden Griffins in the NHL
As of July 1, 2022.

See also
 Canisius Golden Griffins

References

External links
Canisius Golden Griffins

 
Ice hockey teams in New York (state)